The lieutenant-governor of New South Wales is a government position in the state of New South Wales, Australia, acting as a deputy to the governor of New South Wales. The office was first created in October 1786, before the arrival of the First Fleet, to act as a deputy to the first governor, Arthur Phillip. At that time the lieutenant-governor, or its equivalent of "administrator of the government", was filled by military officers and was a position only created when needed or in times of long absences by the governor. Since 1872 this office has been held concurrently by the chief justice of New South Wales but the position may be retained by the chief justice after their retirement from the Supreme Court of New South Wales.

Role 
Originally, the lieutenant-governor had a legislative role with a seat on the first Legislative Council of New South Wales in 1824; this was later phased out due to the lessening of the powers of the state governor. The role of the governors are enshrined in part 2A of the New South Wales Constitution Act (1902). The office itself has no standing powers but holds a dormant commission to act in the governor's position when needed.

The current role of the lieutenant-governor is to take up the duties of the governor if the governor dies, resigns, or is absent such as in September 2008, when, in the absence of Governor Marie Bashir, the Lieutenant-Governor, James Spigelman, administered the swearing in of the new cabinet of the Nathan Rees government.

If the lieutenant-governor becomes incapacitated while serving in the office of governor or is absent when the governor is also absent, the next most senior judge of the Supreme Court is sworn in as the administrator. This occurred in May 1973 when Sir Leslie Herron died suddenly while the governor, Sir Roden Cutler was overseas. Sir John Kerr became the administrator until Cutler was able to return.

Lieutenant-governors and administrators of NSW

References

External links
 Official Website of the Governor of New South Wales

New South Wales
New South Wales-related lists
Government of New South Wales